Orange Township is one of the twelve townships of Meigs County, Ohio, United States.  The 2000 census found 934 people in the township.

Geography
Located in the northern part of the county, it borders the following townships:
Carthage Township, Athens County - north
Troy Township, Athens County - northeast corner
Olive Township - east
Chester Township - south
Bedford Township - west
Lodi Township, Athens County - northwest corner

No municipalities are located in Orange Township, although the unincorporated community of Tuppers Plains lies along the border with Olive Township in the far northeast.

Name and history
It is one of six Orange Townships statewide.

Government
The township is governed by a three-member board of trustees, who are elected in November of odd-numbered years to a four-year term beginning on the following January 1. Two are elected in the year after the presidential election and one is elected in the year before it. There is also an elected township fiscal officer, who serves a four-year term beginning on April 1 of the year after the election, which is held in November of the year before the presidential election. Vacancies in the fiscal officership or on the board of trustees are filled by the remaining trustees.

References

External links
County website

Townships in Meigs County, Ohio
Townships in Ohio